Churches dedicated to Holy Wisdom (Hagia Sophia, also rendered Saint Sophia) include:

See also

Sophia of Rome#Churches, for churches named after Saint Sophia of Rome
Sofia Church (disambiguation), for churches named Sofia for some other reason

Holy Wisdom